Paul Schäfer Schneider (4 December 1921 – 24 April 2010) was a Nazi, child rapist, German-Chilean Christian minister, and the founder and leader of a sect and agricultural commune of 300 German immigrants called Colonia Dignidad (Dignity Colony) (later renamed Villa Baviera) located in Parral in southern Chile, about  south of Santiago from 1961 to 2005. Schäfer led his followers in the teachings of William Branham. Aside from human rights abuses against members of Colonia Dignidad, including the sexual and physical abuse (including torture) of young children, Schäfer maintained a relationship with Pinochet's military dictatorship (1973–1990) and was involved in weapons smuggling and the torture and extrajudicial killings of political dissidents. After the end of Pinochet's government, increased public awareness of the activities of Colonia Dignidad following testimony by former victims led to the issuing of a warrant for Schäfer's arrest. Living underground for eight years, he spent the last five years of his life in prison in Chile.

Early life and education
Schäfer was born the town of Troisdorf, near Bonn, Germany, to Anna (née Schneider) and Jakob Schäfer. He was described as a poor and clumsy student. Schäfer's family was Lutheran. In an accident with a fork, he lost his right eye. He joined a German YMCA-„Eichenkreuz“-Group.
During World War II he served by carrying stretchers of the wounded in a German field hospital in occupied France, later in life claiming that his glass eye was the result of a war wound.

German sect
Following World War II in 1945, Schäfer served as a young people's leader in the Evangelical Free Church. He was removed from his position there after rumors arose that he was molesting young boys. He then set out as an itinerant preacher and singer, traveling around Germany and preaching. During the 1950s, Schäfer became a follower and promoter of the teachings of American preacher, William M. Branham, one of the founders of the post-World War II healing revival who was also an influence on Jim Jones. Schäfer had been following the ministry of Branham from Germany, and was very excited when Branham made a personal visit to Germany in 1955. Schäfer  and other members of his church served as William Branham's personal security detail on his 1955 European tour. Branham advocated "a strict adherence to the Bible, a woman's duty to obey her husband and apocalyptic visions, such as Los Angeles sinking beneath the ocean." Branham held multiple revival campaigns across Europe and Germany during the early 1950s. Schäfer became a friend of Branham who promoted a return to "a more pristine time" of religious and racial purity. 

"Strong ties were forged" between Schäfer, William Branham, and Ewald Frank during Branham's time in Germany. Schafer "was completely fascinated" by Branham, "not only because of his supposed healings, but because behind the latter rain doctrine, the axis of what Branham preached, there was a totalitarian, misogynistic and apocalyptic message, perfect for brainwash all those who were willing to follow him." William Branham's second sermon during his visit to Karlsruhe, Germany, left a deep impression on Schäfer. The sermon was about the Pool of Bethesda, and in it Branham strongly taught that all illness and all sin are actually demons entrenched in the people's bodies. Schäfer claimed to experience a healing in the meeting, and thereafter began to preach very strongly teach that all sin and illness was the result of demonic possession. Following the 1955 meetings with Branham, Schäfer began to put more of William Branham's doctrines into practice in his group, and began to insist to his followers that they were the only "only faithful ones" to William Branham's teachings.

By 1952 Schäfer had gathered a number of followers and in 1953 set up a children's home and orphanage. Schäfer's early followers were predominantly made up of war widows and their children who were refugees from Soviet occupied East Prussia. In 1959, he created the Private Sociale Mission, purportedly a charitable organization. That same year, Schäfer was charged with sexually abusing two young boys. Schäfer was charged and a warrant issued for his arrest by local authorities in Germany. Schäfer fled the children's home in Siegburg, West Germany with some of his followers to the Middle East to relocate his congregation. He came into contact with the Chilean ambassador to Germany, who invited him to Chile.

Colonia Dignidad
In January 1961 Schäfer surfaced in Chile, where the government at the time, led by conservative President Jorge Alessandri, had granted him permission to create the "Dignidad Beneficent Society" on a farm outside of Parral. Schäfer  purchased a 4400 acre ranch which he and 10 of his followers began to prepare for his congregation. In 1963, 230 members of his congregation traveled to Chile in the first wave of immigrants. Another 15 families immigrated in two more waves in 1966 and 1973. Schäfer may have been influenced to move to South America by prophecies of William Branham who repeatedly predicted an imminent nuclear war that would devastate the western nations. Schäfer founded his new community on principles espoused by William Branham, including anti-communism, and the society gradually evolved into the Colonia Dignidad cult community.

Schäfer kept children away from their parents in a children's house. He said, "the problems in child education aren't the children; they are always the parents because the parents are responsible for the sins of the children" (original recording). With the sale of the German children's home, he bought a German stonecrusher, which he used in a quarry. The latter proved profitable in business with Chileans and after six years the first wheat could be harvested, barracks turned into houses and a hospital could be built. When Chilean children were treated and survived, their rescue brought fame to Schäfer in the region.

After a nocturnal hunting accident with a gun, Schäfer was treated in a Santiago hospital for several months. Upon his return, he forbade all festivities, and separated boys from girls and men from women. In 1966, teenage fugitive Wolfgang Kneese hid in the German embassy in Chile and later talked to the press. Schäfer induced another teen named Hartmut Hopp to smear Kneese, accusing him of sexual misconduct at a trial. Kneese managed to flee to Germany. Schäfer allowed Hopp to study medicine in reward, also because he needed a physician in his hospital.

After Salvador Allende came to power in 1970, Schäfer had his community turn the compound into a fortress in fear of dispossession. He smuggled weapons from Germany knowing that containers for his charitable organization were not checked by customs, including machine guns which were soon copied in his machine shops. Schäfer invited , a leader of the neo-Fascist group Patria y Libertad, as well as other opponents offering them the Colonia as a centre for planning a coup against Allende. During this time Schäfer started punishing children with electric shocks to their bodies, including to their genitalia, to keep them in line.

After Augusto Pinochet came to power in 1973, Colonia Dignidad became one of the secret detention, torture and execution centers of the Chilean secret police, the Dirección de Inteligencia Nacional (DINA), the National Intelligence Directorate during the Military dictatorship of Chile (1973–90).

In 1974, Pinochet visited Schäfer at Colonia Dignidad. Schäfer received the right to dig for gold and uranium, and Pinochet a Mercedes Benz limousine. After the US weapon embargo against Chile, Schäfer dealt with Gerhard Mertins who supplied Pinochet with weapons—rockets, tanks and equipment to produce biological weapons.
In 1976 the UN published a report about Pinochet and Amnesty International about torture at the colony, later verified by the Chilean National Commission for Truth and Reconciliation Report.
The German Embassy could no longer ignore the reports, visited the colony, but said suspicions were without evidence. A delegation of the CSU visited as well and was greeted with Bavarian folkdances.

In 1986 Norbert Blüm visited Chile asking Pinochet to stop the torture. Schäfer did not allow Blüm to visit the colony, which Blüm later said was a "model farm of contempt for mankind".

In 1988, the German attorney general finally started proceedings against members of the colony.

In 1990, after Pinochet had stepped down, Patricio Aylwin cut off state funding for Schäfer's hospital, revoking its nonprofit, charitable status and audited the colony's businesses. In 1991, Schäfer privatized his various enterprises. German Chancellor Helmut Kohl visited Chile. He said that Chile needed to open the colony, but nothing further. Schäfer then mobilized the local residents to demonstrate against the closing of his hospital until the Chilean government reopened it. Chilean children were admitted to the colony, as the colony itself had no offspring. Schäfer started molesting Chilean boys but they started resisting. He used sedatives prescribed by physician Hartmut Hopp, and raped children.

Underground, 1996–2005
Only after 26 "colono" children who had attended the commune's free clinic and school reported their abuse, a judge in Santiago issued a warrant for Schäfer’s arrest, 6 years into Chile´s democratic transition. Police could not find him on the compound. Children continued to attend the boarding school, but support of local parents dwindled. Schäfer turned teary-eyed departures into propaganda to prove his innocence. Schäfer finally staged a farewell ceremony and disappeared into the network of tunnels and bunkers under Colonia Dignidad. He disappeared on 20 May 1997, escaping child sex abuse charges, filed by Chilean authorities under President Eduardo Frei Ruiz-Tagle. 
In July 1997, two boys fled to the German embassy; one of them, Tobias Müller, was flown out to Germany.
Schäfer was tried in absence and in late 2004 the Chilean court found him guilty .

He was also under investigation in Chile in connection with the disappearance of Russian mathematician Boris Weisfeiler and alleged human rights abuses.

As of 2005, Schäfer was also wanted in Germany and France in connection with earlier child abuse allegations.

Arrest and death, 2005–2010
In March 2005, Schäfer was found  nearly eight years after his disappearance, hiding in a townhouse in an expensive gated community known as Las Acacias,  from Buenos Aires, Argentina. Following two days of negotiations between Chilean and Argentine authorities, Schäfer was extradited to Chile to face a court hearing. There, he was charged with being involved in the 1976 disappearance of the political activist Juan Maino.

In July 2005, police unearthed Schäfer’s buried military weaponry, much of it World War II vintage, including grenades and machine guns that were produced by the colony.

On 24 May 2006, Schäfer was sentenced to 20 years in jail for sexually abusing 25 children and was ordered to pay 770 million pesos (approximately US$1.5 million) to 11 minors whose representatives had filed claims against Schäfer. Schäfer was found guilty of 20 counts of dishonest abuses and five counts of child rape, all committed between 1993 and 1997.

On 24 April 2010, Schäfer died aged 88 years at the Santiago de Chile's Ex-Penitentiary's Hospital due to heart failure. It was later revealed that he was suffering from a severe cardiac illness.

Literature
 Gero Gemballa: Colonia Dignidad: ein deutsches Lager in Chile. Reinbek bei Hamburg: Rowohlt, 1988. . (Colonia Dignidad: A German camp in Chile)
 Friedrich Paul Heller: Lederhosen, Dutt und Giftgas: Die Hintergründe der Colonia Dignidad. Schmetterling Verlag, 2., erweiterte und aktualisierte Auflage, Stuttgart 2006. . (Lederhosen, hair buns and poison gas: The backgrounds of the Colonia Dignidad)
 Ingo Lenz: Weg vom Leben. 36 Jahre Gefangenschaft in der deutschen Sekte, Ullstein Verlag, Berlin.  (Away from life. 36 years' imprisonment in the German sect)
 Levenda, Peter: Unholy Alliance, a history of Nazi involvement with the Occult (1995) (makes trouble-fraught investigative trip to Colonia Dignidad). 
 Claudio R. Salinas / Hans Stange: Los amigos del "Dr." Schäfer. La complicidad entre el Estado chileno y Colonia Dignidad. Santiago de Chile 2006, . (Friends of "Dr." Schafer: The complicity between the Chilean State and Colonia Dignidad)

Films 
 Colonia (film): Release, 2015; Director, Florian Gallenberger
 The Wolf House: Release, 2018; Director, Christóbal León, Joaquín Cociña
 Colonia Dignidad. Aus dem Innern einer deutschen Sekte (2019). Documentary by Annette Baumeister und Wilfried Huismann. Released as a 52-minute four-part version and a 90-minute two-part version: Part 1: Aus dem Paradies in die Hölle ; Part 2: Aus der Finsternis ans Licht. ARD, 16 and 23 March 2020.
Review by Martin Thull: Herausragendes Dokumentarfernsehen, Medienkorrespondenz, 24 March 2020.

References

External links 
 
 
 
 
 

1921 births
2010 deaths
Child sexual abuse in Germany
Christian fascists
Colonia Dignidad
German anti-communists
German expatriates in Chile
Baptists from Germany
German Army soldiers of World War II
German people imprisoned abroad
German people convicted of rape
German people convicted of child sexual abuse
Religious figures convicted of child sexual abuse
Members of the clergy convicted of rape
Operatives of Operation Condor
People from the Rhine Province
People of the Dirección de Inteligencia Nacional
Prisoners who died in Chilean detention
Protestant religious leaders convicted of crimes
Founders of new religious movements
Sexual abuse scandals in Protestantism